Arun Alexander (14 October 1973 – 28 December 2020) was an Indian actor and a dubbing artist for Tamil-language films. He was notably seen in Maanagaram, Bigil, Kolamavu Kokila, Kaithi, Master and was seen next  posthumously in  Doctor in addition to voicing Optimus Prime and Baloo in the Tamil dubs of Transformers: Age of Extinction and The Jungle Book respectively.

Death 
He died on 28 December 2020 due to a heart attack. The films Master and Doctor were dedicated in his honour.

Filmography 

Actor

Sawaari (2016)
Maanagaram (2017)
Kolamavu Kokila (2018)
Kaithi (2019)
Bigil (2019)
Jada (2019)
Topless (2020) (web series)
Master (2021)
Dikkiloona (2021)
Doctor (2021)

Dubbing artist

 The Shawshank Redemption(1994) for Andy Dufresne - Tamil Version Sherlock Holmes (2009) for Sherlock Holmes - Tamil version
Avatar (2009) - Tamil version
Thor (2011) for Thor Odinson - Tamil version
Ice Age: Continental Drift (2012) for Manny - Tamil VersionRio 2 (2014) -Tamil versionTransformers: Age of Extinction (2014) for Optimus Prime - Tamil versionKathakali (2016)The Jungle Book (2016) for Baloo - Tamil versionIT: Chapter One (2017) for Pennywise the Dancing Clown - Tamil versionAquaman (2018) for Aquaman/Arthur Curry - Tamil versionIT: Chapter Two'' (2019) for Pennywise the Dancing Clown - Tamil version

References

External links

Indian actors
1973 births
2020 deaths
Indian male film actors
Indian voice actors
Indian male voice actors
Male actors in Tamil cinema